Yangtze civilization is a generic name for various ancient Neolithic and Bronze Age cultures from the Yangtze basin of China, the representative civilization of the Chinese alongside the Yellow River civilization.

Cultures

Upper Yangtze 
Pengtoushan culture (7000–6100 BCE)
Daxi culture (5000–3000 BCE)
Qujialing culture (3400–2600 BCE)
Shijiahe culture (2500–2000 BCE)

Lower Yangtze 
Hemudu culture (5500–3300 BCE)
Majiabang culture  (5000–3300 BCE)
Songze culture (3800–3300 BCE)
Liangzhu culture (3300–2300 BCE)
Wucheng culture (1600 BCE–?)

See also
Yellow river civilization
Liao civilization

References

Bronze Age civilizations
Neolithic cultures of China
Yangtze River